Facidina is a genus of moths of the family Noctuidae.

Species
 Facidina polystigma Lower, 1903
 Facidina spilophracta Turner, 1933

References
 Facidina at Markku Savela's Lepidoptera and Some Other Life Forms
 Natural History Museum Lepidoptera genus database

Calpinae
Moth genera